Los Angeles Pacific College may refer to:

Los Angeles Pacific College
Los Angeles Pacific College (defunct)